Peter Edwards, (born 20 November 1955), is a British painter. He won the 1994 BP Portrait Award.

Early career 

In 1980 he exhibited a small self-portrait in the Royal Academy Summer Exhibition. The painting was bought by the art collector, Sir Brinsley Ford. 
 
In 1986 his portrait of The Liverpool Poets was purchased by the National Portrait Gallery. His continuing involvement with the gallery and Robin Gibson then 20th Century Curator (later Chief Curator) led to a major one-man exhibition and tour in the Gallery in April 1990 "Contemporary Poets", which consisted of 17 large canvasses of 20 poets, alongside a poem from each poet, numerous studies, and a series of Saturday morning readings from Seamus Heaney, Douglas Dunn, Charles Causley, Wendy Cope, and Craig Raine.

On 30 July 1991, Bobby Moore unveiled Edwards' portrait of Bobby Charlton in the National Portrait Gallery, Sponsored by British Gas plc, it marked the 25th anniversary of England winning the FIFA World Cup. He later painted Ryan Giggs for the National Library of Wales.

In 1993 he exhibited in The Portrait Now show. In 1994 he won the BP Portrait Award with Portrait of an Artist's Model (of Marguerite Kelsey). She had been the model of choice, in the inter-war years, for many leading artists, including Meredith Frampton. This award led to his commission to paint Kazuo Ishiguro, which was unveiled the following summer in the National Portrait Gallery by Ismail Merchant.

Public collections 
 National Portrait Gallery, London. 6 works. The portraits are of: Adrian Henri, Roger McGough, Brian Patten, (triple portrait known as) The Liverpool Poets. Seamus Heaney, John Heath-Stubbs, Willy Russell, Sir Bobby Charlton, and Kazuo Ishiguro.
 The Metropolitan Museum of Art, New York of the British Poet Peter Reading, and Armenian poet Vahé Oshagan.
 National Museum Wales, painting of Tyrone O'Sullivan.
 Ulster Museum, Belfast, painting of Michael Longley.
 National Library of Wales, 6 works
St Andrews University, portrait of Principal Struther Arnott
 Birmingham University
Warwick University, painting of Sir Christopher Zeeman
Ferens Gallery, Hull
National Museums Liverpool portrait of Willy Russell
Williamson Art Gallery, Birkenhead
Moma Wales, Sir Kyffyn Williams, Ruth Lambert
St Georges hospital, London
 Sheffield University Portraits of Sir Peter Middleton and Sir Harry Kroto
Manchester University portraits of Sir Martin Harris and Alan Gilbert

Bibliography 
The National Portrait Gallery Collection, 1988. Page 203 colour illustration The Liverpool Poets Oil on canvass, 175.9 x 237.5 By Peter Edwards, 1985 (5853) 
Contemporary Poets, Portraits By Peter Edwards, A National portrait Gallery Exhibition, 1990. "Foreword" by Robin Gibson Curator 20th Century Collection. . view
The Portrait Now, National Portrait Gallery, 1993. Page 52. 
drawings paintings and sculptures, the catalogue. Published by the museums and galleries of Northern Ireland. . Page 247 Portrait of Michael Longley b.1939 (1989–1990) U4825
Royal Academy Illustrated 1996, A Souvenir of the 228th Summer Exhibition. Page 10, Peter Edwards Self Portrait Oil 7 × 5 ins.

References

External links

 National Portrait Gallery – Peter Edwards
Artist's website.
The works of Peter Edwards on Art UK
National Museum Wales
Metropolitan Museum of Art, New York
Edwards as sitter in The National Portrait Gallery
Adrian Henri website

1955 births
Living people
People from Denbighshire
People educated at Oswestry School
British portrait painters
20th-century British painters
British male painters
21st-century British painters
BP Portrait Award winners
People from Chirk
People from Oswestry
20th-century British male artists
21st-century British male artists